Koen Kessels (born 1961) is a Belgian conductor and music director of The Royal Ballet and Birmingham Royal Ballet.

Trained as a pianist, Kessels studied at the Royal Conservatoire of Antwerp.

He has conducted at the Opéra national de Paris, the New York City Ballet and the Vienna State Opera, among others.

Kessels is an honorary professor at Birmingham University, artistic director of Inspiratum and on the artistic direction team at the Royal Conservatoire of Antwerp.

References

1960s births
Belgian conductors (music)
Belgian male musicians
Male conductors (music)
Living people
21st-century conductors (music)
21st-century male musicians